The Chilean Corralero or Chilean Criollo is the Chilean national breed of Criollo horse. Like all Criollo horses, it descends from horses brought to the Americas from Spain by the Conquistadors.

It is strongly associated with the huaso or Chilean stock herder, and is much used for working cattle and in Chilean rodeo; it is valued for its cattle sense.

In 2012 it was estimated that there were between 75,000 and 85,000 Corralero horses in Chile, with some 40,000 breeding mares and 3,000 stallions.

References

Further reading 

Araya Gomez, Alberto, (1989). El Caballo Chileno en el Siglo XX, Imprenta Gonzalo Amenábar H., Providencia, Santiago, Chile.
Encina, Francisco A., (Nov.1934). "De Un Estudio Sobre el Caballo Chileno" El Campesino Magazine, Santiago, Chile.
Prado P., Uldaricio, (1914). El Caballo Chileno 1541 a 1914, Estudio Zootécnico e Histórico Hípico, Imprenta Santiago, Santiago, Chile.

Horse breeds
Horse breeds originating in Chile
Rodeo in Chile